Joseph Ganda may refer to:
 Joseph Ganda (bishop)
 Joseph Ganda (footballer)